Bluff Springs Township is one of eleven townships in Cass County, Illinois, USA.  As of the 2020 census, its population was 886 and it contained 384 housing units.

Geography

Unincorporated towns
 Bluff Springs
(This list is based on USGS data and may include former settlements.)

Cemeteries
The township contains these seven cemeteries: Beard, Carr, Dupes, Hager, Lee, McLane and Wells.

Major highways
  Illinois Route 125

Rivers
 Little Sangamon River
 Sangamon River

Lakes
 Clear Lake 
 Cottonwood Lake
 Eagle Lake

Demographics
As of the 2020 census there were 886 people, 219 households, and 177 families residing in the township. The racial makeup of the township was 90.41% White, 0.00% African American, 0.45% Native American, 0.45% Asian, 0.45% Pacific Islander, 5.76% from other races, and 2.48% from two or more races. Hispanic or Latino of any race were 10.16% of the population.

There were 219 households, out of which 42.00% had children under the age of 18 living with them, 65.30% were married couples living together, 11.42% had a female householder with no spouse present, and 19.18% were non-families. 7.80% of all households were made up of individuals, and 5.00% had someone living alone who was 65 years of age or older. The average household size was 2.62 and the average family size was 2.74.

The township's age distribution consisted of 18.5% under the age of 18, 6.7% from 18 to 24, 21.2% from 25 to 44, 41.6% from 45 to 64, and 12.0% who were 65 years of age or older. The median age was 46.8 years. For every 100 females, there were 120.4 males. For every 100 females age 18 and over, there were 112.5 males.

The median income for a household in the township was $84,276, and the median income for a family was $83,750. Males had a median income of $53,523 versus $32,500 for females. The per capita income for the township was $34,518. About 7.3% of families and 12.8% of the population were below the poverty line, including 11.7% of those under age 18 and 24.3% of those age 65 or over.

School districts
 A C Central Community Unit School District 262
 Beardstown Community Unit School District 15
 Virginia Community Unit School District 64

Political districts
 Illinois's 18th congressional district
 State House District 93
 State Senate District 47

References
 
 United States Census Bureau 2007 TIGER/Line Shapefiles
 United States National Atlas

External links
 City-Data.com
 Illinois State Archives

Townships in Cass County, Illinois
Townships in Illinois
1923 establishments in Illinois